Arthur W. Perdue Stadium is a baseball stadium in Salisbury, Maryland.  It is the home of the Baltimore Orioles Carolina League affiliate Delmarva Shorebirds. Named for the founder of Perdue Farms, Arthur Perdue, it features the Eastern Shore Baseball Hall of Fame. The stadium seats 5,200 fans and opened in 1996.

As the second-largest seating venue in Salisbury, it also occasionally is used for concerts or other events. Until 2016, the larger Wicomico Youth and Civic Center had a real covenant against serving alcohol. As such, the stadium was chosen as the venue for Fernando Guerrero's middleweight title-winning boxing match in October 2009.

The University of Maryland Eastern Shore Hawks of the Mid-Eastern Athletic Conference (MEAC) played their 2018 and 2019 seasons at Perdue Stadium while Hawk Stadium in Princess Anne was renovated. Perdue Stadium hosted the Mid-Eastern Athletic Conference baseball tournament from 2015 to 2017.

In 1998, the stadium hosted the Delmarva Rockfish, a team in the single-season Maryland Fall Baseball league.

Renovations
Perdue Stadium has undergone renovations, including a total field replacement, new seating, new video scoreboard, and a wraparound 360 degree deck, beginning in 2014. In June 2019 it was announced that at the beginning of August the protective netting behind home plate would be extended from the nearends of each dugout to the far ends of each dugout.

References

External links
Perdue Stadium | Delmarva Shorebirds Arthur W. Perdue Stadium
 Arthur W. Perdue Stadium Views – Ball Parks of the Minor Leagues

Sports venues in Maryland
Minor league baseball venues
Buildings and structures in Salisbury, Maryland
Tourist attractions in Wicomico County, Maryland
Sports venues completed in 1996
Baseball venues in Maryland
1996 establishments in Maryland

College baseball venues in the United States
Maryland Eastern Shore Hawks baseball
Perdue family
Carolina League ballparks